Gorillas, also known under the source code's file name GORILLA.BAS, is a video game first distributed with MS-DOS 5 and published in 1991 by Microsoft. It is a turn-based artillery game. With allusions to King Kong, the game consists of two gorillas throwing explosive bananas at each other above a city skyline. The players can adjust the angle and velocity of each throw as well as the gravitational pull of the planet. 

Written in QBasic, it is one of the programs included as a demonstration of that programming language. The others are Nibbles (another game), Money (a simple financial calculator), and REMLINE (a program to remove line numbers from old BASIC programs).

QB64 version
QB64 included a copy of Gorillas, adapted to be run at proper speed, until it was removed due to copyright concerns. As the compiler does not support DEF FN for inline functions, the original code was also adapted to use regular functions.

See also
 DONKEY.BAS
 NIBBLES.BAS

References

External links
 Game source code download Original version by IBM Corporation (archived)
 Gorillas.js - An open source, browser-based version of Gorillas written in JavaScript (source)
 Free Android Gorillas on Play Store - Android version of Gorillas
 Gorilla for CP/M - Porting of Gorillas in Turbo Modula-2 for CP/M systems
 VB.NET Version of game
 MS-DOS 5 included games at MobyGames

1991 video games
Artillery video games
BASIC software
Commercial video games with freely available source code
CP/M games
DOS games
GP2X games
IBM software
Linux games
MacOS games
Microsoft games
Video games developed in the United States
Windows games